M. intermedia  may refer to:
 Mico intermedia, the Hershkovitz's marmoset or Aripuanã marmoset, a monkey species endemic to Brazil
 Microvoluta intermedia, a sea snail species
 Mitra intermedia, a sea snail species
 Mycalesis intermedia, a butterfly species found in Asia
 Myristica intermedia, a tree species in genus Myristica

See also
 Intermedia (disambiguation)